The House of Representatives of Belize is one of two chambers of the National Assembly, the other being the Senate. It was created under the 1981 constitution. Members are commonly called "Area Representatives."

Area Representatives are elected by winning a majority of votes in their respective constituencies under the first-past-the-post system. The body is directly descended from the British Honduras Legislative Assembly created in 1954 with nine elected members. It has been expanded several times since: to 18 in 1961, 28 in 1984, 29 in 1993 and finally to 31 in 2008. The leader of the majority party in the Belize House typically becomes Prime Minister of Belize.

Current members of the House of Representatives by district 
The elected representatives and their constituencies according to the Elections and Boundaries Department are:

Belize District
 Caribbean Shores: Kareem Musa (PUP)
 Freetown: Francis Fonseca (PUP)
 Pickstock: Anthony Mahler (PUP)
 Fort George: Henry Charles Usher (PUP)
 Lake Independence: Cordel Hyde (PUP)
 Albert: Tracy Panton (UDP)
 Collet: Patrick Faber (UDP)
 Mesopotamia: Shyne Barrow (UDP), Leader of the opposition
 Queen's Square: Denise "Sista B" Barrow (UDP)
 Port Loyola: Gilroy Usher Sr. (PUP)
 Belize Rural North: Marconi Prince Leal (PUP)
 Belize Rural South: Abner ‘Andre’ Perez (PUP)
 Belize Rural Central:  Dolores Balderamos-Garcia (PUP)

Orange Walk District
 Orange Walk North: Ramon "Monchi" Cervantes (PUP)
 Orange Walk Central: Juan "Johnny" Antonio Briceño (PUP), Prime Minister
 Orange Walk East: Kevin Bernard (PUP)
 Orange Walk South: Jose Abelardo Mai (PUP)

Cayo District
 Cayo North: Michel Chebat (PUP)
 Cayo South: Julius Espat (PUP)
 Cayo West: Jorge "Milin" Espat (PUP)
 Cayo Central: Luis ‘Alex’ Balona (PUP)
 Cayo North East: Orlando Habet (PUP)
 Belmopan: Oscar Mira (PUP)

Corozal District
 Corozal North: Hugo Patt (UDP)
 Corozal South West: Ramiro Ramirez (PUP)
 Corozal Bay: Elvia Vega-Samos (PUP)
 Corozal South: Florencio Marin Jr. (PUP)

Stann Creek District
 Dangriga: Dr. Louis Zabaneh  (PUP)
 Stann Creek West: Rodwell Ferguson (PUP)

Toledo District
 Toledo West: Oscar Requena (PUP)
 Toledo East: Michael Espat (PUP)

Elections

Next election

According to Section 84 of the Constitution of Belize, the National Assembly must be dissolved "five years from the date when the two Houses of the former National Assembly first met" unless dissolved sooner by the Governor-General of Belize upon the advice of the prime minister. and the election held within three months of the dissolution. The current parliament first met on Friday 13 November 2020, so the next election must be held no later than 13 February 2026.

Past elections
 
The most recent general election to the House of Representatives, held on 11 November 2020, was the 16th since 1954 when universal literate adult suffrage was introduced, and the 8th since independence from the United Kingdom in 1981. The People's United Party led by Johnny Briceño entered Government for the first time last winning in 2003. It won 26 seats, while the United Democratic Party won only 5 seats.

See also
List of speakers of the House of Representatives of Belize

References

External links 
 Belize House of Representatives

 
1981 establishments in Belize
Belize
Government of Belize